West Virginia Route 527 is a north–south state highway located entirely in Huntington, West Virginia. The southern terminus of the route is at Interstate 64 exit 8, where WV 527 becomes West Virginia Route 152 upon crossing the expressway. The northern terminus is on the West Virginia Department of Transportation-maintained Robert C. Byrd Bridge, better known as the Sixth Street Bridge, where the route becomes State Route 527 upon crossing into Ohio. In Ohio, SR 527 continues northward to State Route 7 in Chesapeake.

West Virginia State Route 527 currently follows the former routing of U.S. Route 52 in Huntington. While the current Sixth Street Bridge was opened to traffic in 1995, its predecessor once carried U.S. Route 52 across the Ohio River to SR 7 where it turned west toward Portsmouth, Ohio.  The current numbering of 527 is derived from WVDOT's internal system for designating roads which is designated as Route 52/7 (running from US 52 to Ohio State Route 7).

The southern terminus of WV 527 is most unusual, as it also serves as the northern terminus of WV 152, which continues along the same street as it passes over I-64 (both state routes are indicated on exit signage on the expressway). WV 152 continues along the former routing of US 52 until its intersection with US 52 four miles (6 km) north of Crum.

Major intersections

527
Transportation in Cabell County, West Virginia
Huntington, West Virginia